Federal Route 110, or Persiaran Putra, is a major federal road in Kuah town, Langkawi Island, Kedah, Malaysia. It was named after Tunku Abdul Rahman Putra Al-Haj, the first Malaysian Prime Minister and also former Langkawi district officer. The Kilometre Zero of the Federal Route 110 starts at Langkawi Ring Road junctions.

Features

At most sections, the Federal Route 110 was built under the JKR R5 road standard, with a speed limit of 90 km/h.

List of junctions and towns

References

Malaysian Federal Roads
Roads in Langkawi